Clavus formosus is a species of sea snail, a marine gastropod mollusk in the family Drilliidae.

Description
Its description is almost identical to Clavus laeta (Hinds, 1843)

Distribution
This species occurs in the demersal zone of the Red Sea and the tropical Pacific Ocean off the Philippines. and off Papua New Guinea
.

References

 Reeve, L.A. (1843–46) Monograph of the Genus Pleurotoma. Conchologia Iconica, or Illustrations of the shells of molluscous animals. Vol. 1. Reeve, London. pls 1–18 (1843); pl 19 (1844); pls 20–33 (1845); pls 34–40 + index and errata (1846)
 Tucker, J.K. 2004 Catalog of recent and fossil turrids (Mollusca: Gastropoda). Zootaxa 682:1-1295.
 Kilburn R.N., Fedosov A. & Kantor Yu.I. (2014) The shallow-water New Caledonia Drilliidae of genus Clavus Montfort, 1810 (Mollusca: Gastropoda: Conoidea). Zootaxa 3818(1): 1–69.

External links
 

formosus
Gastropods described in 1846